András Hajós (born 3 May 1969, Budapest) is a Hungarian sociologist, singer, songwriter, comedian. In 2009 he was awarded the Déri János Prize.

Biography
Born in 1969. He graduated from the Madách Imre Gimnázium in Budapest in 1987, after which he was recruited several times in the legal career, without results. However, he did not want to shame his brain research father without enrolling in a diploma, so he enrolled in sociology and obtained a degree in 1998. He then worked on a number of jobs: former waiter, manager, press in the town hall, founded jazz band in 1993 and commercial television channels since 2003.

According to his own statement, his scientific knowledge was not too high in his broadcast on the chemistry teaching of RTL Klub's Weekly Seven (Heti Hetes) on 23 December 2007 when he talked about potassium sulphate.

Career

Musician career
Founded in 1993, Emil.RuleZ! band frontman. His special style and humor earned a large fan base for the orchestra. So far, four albums have appeared: , Hisztis, Zanga!zanga, and Gyere át!, as well as two of their singles  Hello, tourist!  and Ebola Cola.

Film and television career
His own talkshow was launched in the spring of 2003 as Private Number, which was first aired on TV2, and after a break, Viasat 3 saw the audience Late Night with András Hajós. Since the end of the program, Hajós has strengthened the band of the weekly TV show of the RTL Klub. In 2005, he led me to Be in TV, where nine of them could be seen.

In the movie world, Get Up  was released in 2002. Since then, he has had a Happy Birthday! (2003), Magyar vándor (2004), Zsiguli (2004), Virgo (2006). In 2007, the Go to Steam in Koltai's comedy, he formed the Gigantic Blind.

András Hajós's best friend, companion and presenter in the programs of Private and KEHA. Boogie's Children's Plush Puncher, who was not yet two years old when he named the game later on for the media, was the classmate of Hajós High School, Csaba Bohemian Gaál. The figure associated with András Hajós is not the same as the ÁNTSZ doctor, although they are famous.

Since 2018, he has been hosting the culinary show The Great Bake Off Hungary, the Hungarian version of Great British Bake Off.

Political views 
His flagship of the ship was defined as a liberal democrat, himself as a fellow father of two children (he has since had another child). For a long time he was spiritually close to Alliance of Free Democrats. Prior to his career as a television and musician, he worked for years in the press department of the Mayor's Office, at the same time he wrote the words of Gábor Demszky.

On 22 September 2006, Ferenc Gyurcsány, Prime Minister, called for a resignation in HírTV for the 2006 moves. He did the RTL Klub as unethical and officially condemned but since the contract did not bind to the channel, RTL Klub's legal and other steps did not follow the incident, Hajós could remain on screen as a permanent actor of the weekly public program (until 2013 when he has been converted to TV2).

References

External links
 

Television people from Budapest
1969 births
Living people
20th-century Hungarian male singers
Hungarian comedians
Hungarian sociologists
Hungarian songwriters
Hungarian television presenters
Musicians from Budapest
21st-century Hungarian male singers